The Volvo Sport (also known as P1900) is a Swedish fiberglass-bodied roadster of which sixty-eight units were built, first 19 by Glasspar Company in California, between 1956 and 1957 by Volvo Cars.

Assar Gabrielsson, Volvo's president and founder, got the idea for the car when he saw a Chevrolet Corvette in the United States and wanted to make something similar. He asked Bill Tritt of Glasspar, an American boatbuilder in Santa Ana, California, to design and tool a fibreglass/reinforced polyester body, which was later produced in Sweden. Glasspar was a pioneer in building fiberglass auto bodies from 1951 to 1957.

Erik Quistgaard was appointed as development team leader.
The car was built on a tubular-steel chassis and used the Volvo PV444's 1414 cc engine producing . The engines (B14A and B16B ) were fitted with twin SU carburetors, driving through a three-speed manual gearbox. Many other parts were taken also from the Volvo PV444.

Demand was low, and the build quality was not up to Volvo standards. Gunnar Engellau, who replaced Gabrielsson as president in 1956, took one for a drive on a holiday weekend and was dissatisfied enough that on returning to his office the following week cancelled the remaining production. "I thought it would fall apart!" is the legendary quote. The Volvo chassis design was far too flexible to accommodate a fiberglass body, and that Volvo resisted recommendations by Glasspar to alter the frame to address their concerns.

The total "Volvo Sport" production was sixty-eight cars, plus four or five prototypes. Forty-four were built in 1956, mostly for the Swedish market, and most still survive. The bulk of 1957's production went to the U.S. and elsewhere, and fewer of these are still in existence.

However the development of the P-1900 led to the tuning of the B-16 engine, which was later put into the PV 444 series, making this car powerful enough to enter the US market.

Gallery

References

External links
 Czap, Nick (February 18, 2010).  "Unrequited Longing for the 67th Volvo".  The New York Times.  Accessed February 24, 2010.

P1900
Sports cars
Rear-wheel-drive vehicles
Cars introduced in 1956
Roadsters